Debbie Heeps (born 18 December 1955) is a Canadian volleyball player. She competed in the women's tournament at the 1976 Summer Olympics.

References

1955 births
Living people
Canadian women's volleyball players
Olympic volleyball players of Canada
Volleyball players at the 1976 Summer Olympics
Sportspeople from Vancouver